Anthony George Eeles (born 15 November 1970) is an English former professional footballer who played as a midfielder.

Born in Chatham, Eeles played for Gillingham between 1989 and 1994, scoring 5 goals in 73 appearances. While with the club, he spent time on loan to Cork City. He is credited as the scorer of one of Gillingham's most important goals, which maintained the Gills' Football League status, when he opened the scoring in a 2–0 home victory in 1993 over fellow relegation candidates Halifax Town.

After leaving Gillingham, Eeles played non-league football for Dover Athletic,  Sittingbourne, Ashford Town (Kent). and Welling United. 

In 2008, whilst working as a plasterer, he was taken seriously ill with dermatomyositis.

References

1970 births
Living people
Sportspeople from Chatham, Kent
Footballers from Kent
English footballers
Gillingham F.C. players
Cork City F.C. players
Dover Athletic F.C. players
Sittingbourne F.C. players
Ashford United F.C. players
Welling United F.C. players
League of Ireland players
Association football midfielders